A competitive local exchange carrier (CLEC), in the United States and Canada, is a  telecommunications provider company (sometimes called a "carrier") competing with other, already established carriers, generally the incumbent local exchange carrier (ILEC).

Background
Local exchange carriers (LECs) are divided into incumbent (ILECs) and competitive (CLECs). The ILECs are usually the original, monopoly LEC in a given area, and receive different regulatory treatment from the newer CLECs. A data local exchange carrier (DLEC) is a CLEC specializing in  DSL services by leasing lines from the ILEC and reselling them to Internet service providers (ISPs).

History

CLECs evolved from the competitive access providers (CAPs) that began to offer private line and special access services in competition with the ILECs beginning in 1985.  The CAPs (such as Teleport Communications Group (TCG) and Metropolitan Fiber Systems (MFS)) deployed fiber optic systems in the central business districts of the largest U.S. cities (New York, Chicago, Boston, etc.) A number of state public utilities commissions, particularly New York, Illinois, and Massachusetts, encouraged this competition. By the early 1990s, the CAPs began to install switches in their fiber systems. Initially, they offered a "shared PBX" service with these switches and interconnected with the ILECs as end users rather than as co-carriers. However, the New York Public Service Commission authorized the nation's first CLEC when it required the New York Telephone (the ILEC) to allow Teleport Communications Group's switches in New York City to connect as peers. Other states followed New York's lead so that by the mid-1990s most of the large states had authorized local exchange competition.

Growth

The Telecommunications Act of 1996 incorporated the successful results of the state-by-state authorization process by creating a uniform national law to allow local exchange competition. This had the  unintended consequence of stimulating the formation of many more CLECs than the markets could bear. The formation of these CLECs, with easy financing from equipment vendors and  IPOs, was a significant contributor to the "telecom bubble" of the late 1990s which then turned into the "bust" of 2001–2002.

The original CAP/CLECs spent the decade from 1985-1995 deploying their own fiber optics networks and digital switches so that their only reliance on the ILEC was leasing some DS-1 loops to locations not served by the CLEC's own fiber and interconnecting the CLEC's switches with the ILECs' on a peer-to-peer basis. While not trivial dependencies, the original "facilities-based" CLECs such as TCG and MFS were beginning to become profitable by the time the Telecom Act was adopted. In contrast, many CLECs formed in the post-Telecom Act "bubble" operated using the unbundled Network Element Platform (UNE-P), in which they resold the ILECs' service by leasing the underlying copper and port space on the ILEC's local switch. This greater dependency on the ILECs made these "UNE-P CLECs" vulnerable to changes in the UNE-P rules.

In the meantime, the largest facilities-based CLECs, MFS, and TCG, had IPOs and then were acquired by WorldCom and AT&T, respectively, in 1996 and 1998 as those long distance companies prepared to defend their business customers from the Regional Bell Operating Companies' (RBOC) incipient entry into the long distance business.

Important FCC rulings
With the Triennial Review in August 2003, the FCC began to rewrite a large portion of the rules implementing the Telecommunications Act of 1996. One alternative to the UNE-P is unbundled network element loop (UNE-L), in which the CLEC has access to or operates their own local switch. The underlying copper (loop) that runs to the subscriber's premises is then leased by the CLEC, and cross-connected to the CLEC's switch. Both UNE-P and UNE-L have their own unique advantages and disadvantages. Other CLECs bypass the ILEC's network entirely, using their own facilities. These facility-based LECs include cable companies offering phone service over coaxial cable.

Non facilities-based CLECs that operate under the UNE-P rules are able to resell wholesale services purchased from multiple ILECs, thereby establishing broader geographical coverage than ILECs or facilities-based CLECs.

In October 2004, the U.S. Supreme Court allowed a lower court's ruling to stand (by refusing to hear the appeal) that voided rules requiring ILECs to lease certain network elements (such as local switching or the high-frequency portion of the loop) at a cost-based regulated wholesale price to CLECs. The FCC agreed earlier in the year to rewrite rather than appeal the validity of the rules. In December 2004, the FCC released another set of rules which phase out, over a year, all CLEC leasing of ILEC local switching, while preserving access to most copper local loops and some interoffice facilities.

Proposed termination 
In May 2018, USTelecom, the Washington, D.C. trade group for the major telecommunication companies, filed a petition with the FCC, asking it to end the leasing rule within  years, which would terminate the CLEC operations of smaller telecommunications companies.

See also
 Liberalization
 Deregulation
 Regional Bell operating company
 Mobile virtual network operator
 Local loop unbundling
 Cable telephony

References

External links
FCC Carrier Search—select "CAP/CLEC" under Principal Communications Type for a complete list of CLECs

Telecommunications companies
United States communications regulation